The 2006 Trail Appliances Autumn Gold Curling Classic was the 29th annual edition of the event. It marked the first Grand Slam event of the Women's World Curling Tour. It was also the first ever women's Grand Slam event to be held, as it was the first season for the women's Grand Slam. The event was held October 6-9 at the Calgary Curling Club in Calgary, Alberta. The total purse for the event was $51,000 with $14,000 going to the winning team of Kelly Scott, Jeanna Schraeder, Sasha Carter and Renee Simons. They beat Crystal Webster's rink in the final.

Participating teams (skips)
 Sherry Anderson
 Glenys Bakker
 Cheryl Bernard
 Renelle Bryden
 Diane Foster
 LaDawn Funk
 Kerry Galusha
 Brittany Gregor
 Jenn Hanna
 Janet Harvey
 Amber Holland
 Kristy Jenion
 Jennifer Jones
 Andrea Kelly
 Cathy King
 Shannon Kleibrink
 Stefanie Lawton
 Terry Loschuk
 Kyla MacLachlan
 Krista McCarville
 Moe Meguro
 Sherry Middaugh
 Karen Porritt
 Ludmila Privivkova
 Heather Rankin
 Jo-Ann Rizzo
 Deb Santos
 Kelly Scott
 Renee Sonnenberg
 Barb Spencer
 Wang Bingyu
 Crystal Webster

Playoffs

Autumn Gold Curling Classic
2006 in Canadian curling
Trail Appliances
2006 in women's curling